Simphiwe is a South African male given name that may refer to
Simphiwe Dana (born 1980), South African singer-songwriter 
Simphiwe Dludlu (born 1987), South African football defender
Simphiwe Khonco, South African boxer
Simphiwe Manqele (born 1997), South African Top guy 
Simphiwe Nongqayi (born 1972), South African boxer 
Simphiwe Yiba (born 1992), South African cricketer

African masculine given names